The women's triathlon is part of the Triathlon at the 2022 Commonwealth Games program. The competition was held on 29 July 2022 at Sutton Park, Birmingham.

Schedule
All times are British Summer Time (UTC+1)

Competition format
The race was once again held over the "sprint distance" and consisted of  swimming,  road bicycling, and  road running.

Field

Current Olympic gold and silver medalists Flora Duffy of Bermuda and Georgia Taylor-Brown of England entered as pre-race favourites. Duffy also returns as 2018 Commonwealth Games champion.

Results

References

Triathlon at the 2022 Commonwealth Games